India is the third largest producer of electricity in the world. 
During the fiscal year (FY) 2021–22, the total electricity generation in the country was 1,719 TWh, of which 1,484 TWh was generated by utilities.

The gross electricity consumption per capita in FY2019 was 1,208 kWh. In FY2015, electric energy consumption in agriculture was recorded as being the highest (17.89%) worldwide. 
The per capita electricity consumption is low compared to most other countries despite India having a low electricity tariff.

The national electric grid in India has an installed capacity of 410.3 GW as of 31 December 2022.  
Renewable power plants, which also include large hydroelectric power plants, constitute 40.7% of the total installed capacity. 
India has a surplus power generation capacity but lacks adequate fuel supply and power distribution infrastructure. 
The average capacity factor of thermal power plants is below 60% against the norm of 85%. 

India's electricity sector is dominated by fossil fuels, in particular coal, which produced about three-quarters of the country's electricity. 
The government declared its efforts to increase investment in renewable energy. The government's draft National Electricity Plan of 2022 states that the country does not need anymore fossil fuel power plants in the utility sector until 2027 besides those currently under construction. 
It is expected that non-fossil fuel generation contribution is likely to be around 44.7% of the total gross electricity generation by 2029–30.

History

The first demonstration of electric light in Calcutta (now Kolkata) was conducted on 24 July 1879 by P.W. Fleury & Co. On 7 January 1897, Kilburn & Co secured the Calcutta electric lighting license as agents of the Indian Electric Co, which was registered in London on 15 January 1897. A month later, the company was renamed the Calcutta Electric Supply Corporation. The control of the company was transferred from London to Calcutta only in 1970. The introduction of electricity in Calcutta was a success, and power was next introduced in Bombay (now Mumbai). The first electric lighting demonstration in Mumbai was in 1882 at Crawford Market and the Bombay Electric Supply & Tramways Company (BEST) set up a generating station in 1905 to provide electricity for the tramway.

The first hydroelectric installation in India was installed near a tea estate at Sidrapong for the Darjeeling Municipality in 1897. The first electric street light in Asia was lit on 5 August 1905 in Bangalore. The first electric train in the country ran on the Harbour Line between Bombay's Victoria Terminus and Kurla on 3 February 1925. The first high-voltage laboratory of India was established at the Government Engineering College, Jabalpur in 1947. On 18 August 2015, Cochin International Airport became the world's first fully solar powered airport with the inauguration of a dedicated solar plant.

India began using grid management on a regional basis in the 1960s. Individual State grids were interconnected to form 5 regional grids covering mainland India, the Northern, Eastern, Western, North Eastern and Southern Grids. These regional links were established to enable transmission of surplus electricity between states in each region. In the 1990s, the Indian government began planning for a national grid. Regional grids were initially interconnected by asynchronous high-voltage direct current (HVDC) back-to-back links facilitating the limited exchange of regulated power. The links were subsequently upgraded to high capacity synchronous links.

The first interconnection of regional grids was established in October 1991 when the North Eastern and Eastern grids were interconnected. The Western Grid was interconnected with these grids in March 2003. The Northern grid was also interconnected in August 2006, forming a Central Grid that was synchronously connected and operating at one frequency. The sole remaining regional grid, the Southern Grid, was synchronously interconnected to the Central Grid on 31 December 2013 with the commissioning of the 765 kV Raichur-Solapur transmission line, establishing the National Grid.

By the end of the calendar year 2015, despite poor hydroelectricity generation, India had become a power surplus nation with huge power generation capacity idling for want of demand. The calendar year 2016 started with steep falls in the international price of energy commodities such as coal, diesel oil, naphtha, bunker fuel, and liquefied natural gas (LNG), which are used in electricity generation in India. As a result of the global glut in petroleum products, these fuels became cheap enough to compete with pit head coal-based power generators. Coal prices have also fallen. Low demand for coal has led to coal stocks building up at power stations as well as coal mines. New installations of renewable energy in India surpassed installations of fossil fuel for the first time in 2016–17.

On 29 March 2017, the Central Electricity Authority (CEA) stated that for the first time India has become a net exporter of electricity. India exported 5,798 GWh to neighboring countries, against a total import of 5,585 GWh.

The Government of India launched a program called "Power for All" in 2016. The program was accomplished by December 2018 in providing the necessary infrastructure to ensure uninterrupted electricity supply to all households, industries, and commercial establishments. Funding was made through a collaboration between the Government of India and its constituent states.

Installed capacity

The total installed power generation capacity is the sum of utility capacity, captive power capacity, and other non-utilities which is 482.232 GW as on 31 March 2022.

Utility power

Nearly 32,285 MW coal and gas based thermal power projects are under construction as on 1 April 2021.

The total installed utility power generation capacity as on 30 September 2022 by type is given below.

Hydroelectric power plants with ≤ 25 MW generation capacity are included in Renewable category (classified as SHP – Small Hydro Project)

Captive power
The installed captive power generation capacity (above 1 MW capacity) associated with industry-owned plants is 82,735 MW as of 31 March 2022. In the fiscal year 2021–22, captive power generation was 235,000 GWh. Diesel power generation sets of 75,000 MW capacity (excluding sets of size above 1 MW and below 100 kVA) are also installed in the country. In addition, there are a large number of diesel generators of capacity less than 100 kVA to cater to emergency power needs during power outages in all sectors.

Installed capacity by state or territory

This is a list of states and territories of India by installed power generation capacity.

Other Renewable Energy sources include SHP (Small Hydro Power – hydel plants ≤ 25 MW), Biomass Power, Urban & Industrial waste, Solar and Wind Energy

Demand

Demand trend
During the fiscal year 2019–20, the utility energy availability was 1,284.44 billion KWh, a shortfall relative to requirements by 6.5 billion KWh (−0.5%). Peak load met was 182,533 MW, 1,229 MW (−0.6%) below requirements. In the 2020 Load Generation Balance report, India's Central Electricity Authority anticipated energy surplus and peak surplus to be 2.7% and 9.1%, respectively, for the 2020–21 fiscal year. Power would be made available to few states expected to face shortages from states with a surplus, through regional transmission links. From the calendar year 2015 onwards, power generation in India has been less of a problem than power distribution.

Demand drivers

Nearly 0.07% of Indian households (0.2 million) have no access to electricity. The International Energy Agency estimates India will add between 600 GW to 1,200 GW of additional new power generation capacity before 2050. This added new capacity is similar in scale to the 740 GW total power generation capacity of the European Union (EU-27) in 2005.  The technologies and fuel sources India adopts as it adds this electricity generation capacity may have a significant impact on global resource usage and environmental issues. The demand for electricity for cooling (HVAC) is projected to grow rapidly.

According to the analysis presented in the India Cooling Action Plan (ICAP) released by the Ministry of Environment, Forests and Climate Change, only 8 percent of Indian households own air-conditioning units. The cooling demand across India is projected to rise at a rate of 15-20 percent annually and aggregated cooling demand will grow to around eight times by 2037-38, as compared to the 2017-18 baseline. In India, 45 percent of the country’s peak electricity demand in 2050 is expected to come from space cooling alone.

About 136 million Indians (11%) use traditional fuels – firewood, agricultural waste and dry animal dung fuel – for cooking and general heating needs. These traditional fuels are burnt in cook stoves, sometimes known as chulah or chulha. Traditional fuel is an inefficient source of energy, and its burning releases high levels of smoke, PM10 particulate matter, PAHs, polyaromatics, formaldehyde, carbon monoxide and other air pollutants, affecting outdoor air quality, haze and smog, chronic health problems, damage to forests, ecosystems and global climate. The World Health Organization estimates that 300,000 to 400,000 people in India die of indoor air pollution and carbon monoxide poisoning every year because of biomass burning and use of chulahs. Burning traditional fuel in conventional cook stoves is estimated to release 5–15x more pollutants than industrial combustion of coal, and is unlikely to be replaced until electricity or clean-burning fuel and combustion technologies become reliably available and widely adopted in rural and urban India. The growth of the electricity sector in India may help find a sustainable alternative to traditional fuel burning.

In addition to air pollution problems, a 2007 study finds that discharge of untreated sewage is the single most important cause for pollution of surface and groundwater in India. The majority of government-owned sewage treatment plants remain closed most of the time in part because of the lack of a reliable electricity supply to operate the plants. Uncollected waste accumulates in urban areas, causing unhygienic conditions, and release heavy metals and pollutants that leaches to surface and groundwater. A reliable supply of electricity is required to address India's water pollution and associated environmental issues.

Other drivers for India's electricity sector are its rapidly growing economy, rising exports, improving infrastructure and increasing household incomes.

Adding to it, the recent coal crisis has raised an alarm as over 60 per cent of the electricity produced in the country is derived from thermal power plants, and thus, depend on coal.

* Data from the fiscal year ending on 31 March of each year.** Refers to the fiscal year ending on 31 December.

Note: Gross per-capita generation=(gross electricity generation by all sources plus net import) / mid-year population. 'Consumption' is 'gross electricity generation by all sources plus net import' after subtracting transmission losses and auxiliary consumption in electricity generation.

The per capita annual domestic electricity consumption in India during the year 2009 was 96 kWh in rural areas and 288 kWh in urban areas for those with access to electricity. Globally the per capita annual average is 2,600 kWh and in the European Union it is 6,200 kWh.

Rural and Urban electrification 

India's Ministry of Power launched Deen Dayal Upadhyaya Gram Jyoti Yojana (DDUGJY) as one of its flagship programs in July 2015 with the objective of providing round-the-clock power to rural areas. The program focused on reforms in the rural power sector by separating feeder lines for rural households from those for agricultural applications and strengthening transmission and distribution infrastructure. A previous scheme for rural electrification, Rajiv Gandhi Grameen Vidyutikaran Yojana (RGGVY) was subsumed into the new scheme. As of 28 April 2018, 12 days ahead of the target date, all Indian villages (a total of 597,464 census villages) were electrified.

India has also achieved close to 100% electrification of all rural and urban households. As of 4 January 2019, 211.88 million rural households were provided with electricity, close to 100% of the 212.65 million total rural households. As of 4 January 2019, 42.937 million urban households are provided with electricity, close to 100% of the 42.941 million total urban households.

Per-Capita consumption

Notes: Per capita consumption = (gross electricity generation + net import) / mid-year population.
Nearly a 24% difference between sales and gross generation due to auxiliary power consumption of thermal power plants and transmission and distribution (T&D) losses, etc.

Electricity generation
India has recorded rapid growth in electricity generation since 1985, increasing from 179 TW-hr in 1985 to 1,057 TW-hr in 2012. The majority of the increase came from coal-fired plants and non-conventional renewable energy sources (RES), with the contribution from natural gas, oil, and hydro plants decreasing in 2012–2017. The gross utility electricity generation (excluding imports from Bhutan) was 1,484 billion kWh in 2021–22, representing 8.1% annual growth compared to 2020–2021. The contribution from renewable energy sources (including large hydro) was nearly 21.7% of the total. In 2019–20, all the incremental electricity generation is contributed by renewable energy sources as the power generation from fossil fuels decreased. During the year 2020–2021, the utility power generation decreased by 0.8%  (11.3 billion kWh) with a reduction in power generation from fossil fuels by 1% and power generation from non-fossil sources is more or less same of the previous year. In 2020–21, India exported more electricity than it imported from neighboring countries. Solar power generation in 2020–21, occupied third place after coal and hydropower generations surpassing wind, gas and nuclear power generations.

Notes: Coal includes lignite; Misc: includes contributions from emergency diesel generator sets, rooftop solar, captive power generation from below 1 MW capacity plants, etc.; *Hydro includes pumped storage generation; na = data not available.

Thermal power

Pollution from coal-based power plants

In India the Commercial Energy makes 74% of total energy, of which coal based energy production is around 72–75%, as per 2020 data. For utility power generation, India consumed 622.22 million tons of coal during 2019–20 which is less by 1% compared to 628.94 million tons during 2018–19. However coal imports for utility power generation increased by 12.3% during year 2019–20 at 69.22 million tons from 61.66 million tons during 2018–19. A large part of the Indian coal reserve is similar to Gondwana coal: it is of low calorific value and high ash content, with poor fuel value. On average, Indian coal has a gross calorific value (GCV) of about 4500 Kcal/kg, whereas in Australia, for example, the GCV is about 6500 Kcal/kg . The result is that Indian power plants using India's coal supply consume about 0.7 kg of coal per kWh of power generation, whereas in the United States thermal power plants consume about 0.45 kg of coal per kWh. In 2017, India imported nearly 130 Mtoe (nearly 200 million tons) of steam coal and coking coal, 29% of total consumption, to meet the demand in electricity, cement and steel production.

The Centre for Science and Environment has assessed the Indian coal-based power sector as one of the most resource-wasteful and polluting sectors in the world, in part due to the high ash content in India's coal. India's Ministry of Environment and Forests has therefore mandated the use of coals whose ash content has been reduced to 34% (or lower) in power plants in urban, ecologically sensitive and other critically polluted areas. The coal ash reduction industry has grown rapidly in India, with current capacity topping 90 megatonnes.

Before a thermal power plant is approved for construction and commissioning in India it must undergo an extensive review process that includes environmental impact assessment. The Ministry of Environment and Forests has produced a technical guidance manual to help project proposers avoid environmental pollution from thermal power plants. As of 2016, the existing coal-fired power stations in the utility and captive power sectors were estimated to require nearly 12.5 million INR per MW capacity to install pollution control equipment to comply with the latest emission norms set out by the Ministry of Environment and Forests. Most of the coal fired stations have not complied installation of flue gas de-sulphurisation units for reducing the pollution. In April 2020, CPCB declared that over 42,000 MW thermal power plants have outlived their lives. India has also banned imports of pet coke for use as fuel. As a signatory to the Paris Agreement, India is also reducing power generation from coal to control the emission of greenhouse gases.

The state and central power generation companies are permitted by the Government of India to minimize the cost of coal transportation using flexible coal linkage swaps from inefficient plants to efficient plants, and from plants situated far from coal mines to plants close to the pit head, leading to a reduction in the cost of power. Although coal imports for consumption in the utility sector are declining, the overall imports of steam coal are increasing as the local coal production is unable to meet the requirements of coal-fired captive power plants. India is introducing single spot auctions/exchanges for all type of coal consumers.

Retirement of old thermal power plants

India's coal-fired, oil-fired and natural gas-fired thermal power plants are inefficient and replacing them with cheaper renewable technologies offers significant potential for greenhouse gas (CO2) emission reduction. India's thermal power plants emit 50% to 120% more CO2 per kWh produced compared to average emissions from their European Union (EU-27) counterparts. The central government plans to retire coal-based plants that are at least 25 years old and contributing excessive pollution, totalling 11,000 MW of capacity. As of 2018 there is no similar retirement plan for the captive power sector. In 2020  Carbon Tracker estimated that phasing out 20 years or more old coal-fired plants and the coal fired plants under construction with electricity sale price exceeding INR 4/kWh with new renewables is more economical as these coal fired plants are imposing heavy financial burden on Discoms.

Some diesel generator plants and gas turbine plants were also decommissioned in 2016 though they are best suitable for catering ancillary services.

Integration of renewable power
India has committed to install 275,000 MW renewable energy capacity by 2027. The existing base load coal and gas based power plants need to be flexible enough to accommodate the variable renewable energy. Also ramping up, ramping down, warm start up, hot start up capabilities of existing coal based power stations are critical to accommodate the frequent variations in renewable power generation. It is also examined to use the retired coal based electric generators as synchronous condensers for improving the grid inertia when it is dominated by static power generation sources like solar and wind power. As the solar power plants remain idle during the night hours, reactive power capability of the inverters installed as part of the solar power plant can also be used during the night time for solving the problem of very high voltage which occurs due to low loads on the transmission lines.

Natural gas supply constraints

The installed capacity of natural gas-based power plants (including the plants ready to be commissioned with the commencement of natural gas supply) was nearly 26,765 MW at the end of the financial year 2014–15. These plants were operating at an overall plant load factor (PLF) of 22% due to a severe shortage of natural gas in the country, and the fact that imported liquid natural gas (LNG) was too expensive for power generation. Many power stations were shut down throughout the year for a lack of natural gas supply. The natural gas shortage for power sector alone was nearly 100 million cubic metre per day at standard conditions. The break-even price for switching from imported coal to LNG in electricity generation was estimated to be approximately US (thermal energy). The Indian government has taken steps to enhance power generation from gas-based power plants by waiving import duties and taxes.

Gasification of coal or lignite or pet coke or biomass produces synthesis gas or syngas (also known as coal gas or wood gas) which is a mixture of hydrogen, carbon monoxide and carbon dioxide gases. Coal gas can be converted into synthetic natural gas  by using the Fischer–Tropsch process at low pressure and high temperature. Coal gas can also be produced by underground coal gasification if the coal deposits are located deep in the ground or it is uneconomical to mine the coal. Synthetic natural gas production technologies promise to dramatically improve India's supply of natural gas. The Dankuni coal complex produces syngas that is piped to industrial users in Calcutta. Many coal-based fertiliser plants can also be economically retrofitted to produce synthetic natural gas. It is estimated that the production cost for syngas could be below US.

Earlier, natural gas use in power generation was thought to be a bridge fuel as it emits far less CO2 (below 50%) when compared to coal use in power generation until renewable power generation without CO2 emissions become economical. Renewable power generation is already cheaper than coal and gas fueled power generation in India. Now the bridge fuel concept is no more valid and existing gas-based generation needs to compete with the coal-based generation when there is no adequate renewable power generation (including storage and peaking type hydropower). The problem of stranded assets/capacity is more deep-rooted for gas-based power plants than that of the coal-based power plants as coal is far cheaper than natural gas in India.

Nuclear power

As of 31 March 2022, India had 6.78 GW of installed nuclear power generation capacity or nearly 1.7% of the total installed utility power generation capacity. Nuclear plants generated 47,063 million kWh at 79.24% PLF in 2021–22.

India's nuclear power plant development began in 1964. India signed an agreement with General Electric (United States) for the construction and commissioning of two boiling water reactors at Tarapur. In 1967, this effort was placed under India's Department of Atomic Energy. In 1971, India set up its first pressurized heavy water reactors with Canadian collaboration in Rajasthan.

In 1987, India created the Nuclear Power Corporation of India Limited to commercialize nuclear power. The Nuclear Power Corporation of India is a public sector enterprise, wholly owned by the Government of India, under the administrative control of the Department of Atomic Energy. The state-owned company has ambitious plans to establish plants totalling to 63 GW generation capacity by 2032.

India's nuclear power generation effort is subject to many safeguards and oversights. Its environmental management system is ISO-14001 certified, and it undergoes peer review by the World Association of Nuclear Operators, including a pre-start-up peer review. The Nuclear Power Corporation of India Limited commented in its annual report for 2011 that its biggest challenge is to address public and policymaker perceptions about the safety of nuclear power, particularly after the Fukushima Daiichi nuclear disaster in Japan.

In 2011, India had 18 pressurized heavy water reactors in operation, with another four projects launched totaling 2.8 GW capacity.  India is in the process of launching its first prototype fast breeder reactor using plutonium-based fuel obtained by reprocessing the spent fuel of first-stage reactors. The prototype reactor is located in Tamil Nadu and has a capacity of 500 MW.

India has nuclear power plants operating in the following states: Maharashtra, Gujarat, Rajasthan, Uttar Pradesh, Tamil Nadu and Karnataka. These reactors have an installed electricity generation capacity of between 100 MW and 1000 MW each. The Kudankulam nuclear power plant (KNPP) is the single largest nuclear power station in India. KNPP Unit 1 with a capacity of 1000 MWe was commissioned in July 2013, while Unit 2, also with a capacity of 1000 MWe, attained criticality in 2016. Two additional units are under construction. The plant has suffered multiple shutdowns, leading to calls for an expert panel to investigate. First 700 MWe  PHWR unit under phase II of Kakrapar Atomic Power Station achieved first criticality in July 2020 and expected to begin commercial operation by December 2022.

In 2011, uranium was discovered in the Tummalapalle uranium mine, the country's largest uranium mine and possibly one of the world's largest. The reserves were estimated at 64,000 tonnes, and could be as large as 150,000 tonnes. The mine began operation in 2012.

India's share of nuclear power plant generation capacity is 1.2% of worldwide nuclear power production capacity, making it the 15th largest nuclear power producer. India aims to supply 9% of its electricity needs with nuclear power by 2032 and 25% by 2050. Jaitapur Nuclear Power Project, India's largest nuclear power plant project, is planned to be implemented in partnership with Électricité de France under an agreement signed on 10 March 2018.

India's government is developing up to 62 additional nuclear reactors, mostly using thorium fuel, which it expects to be operational by 2025. It is the "only country in the world with a detailed, funded, government-approved plan" to focus on thorium-based nuclear power.

Renewable energy

On 12 August 2021, India's grid-connected electricity generation capacity reached 100 GW from non-conventional renewable technologies and 46.21 GW from conventional renewable power or major hydroelectric power plants.As of 12 August 2021, there are about 50 GW of projects under development, and 27 GW that are tendered and yet to be auctioned.

Hydro power

The hydro-electric power plants at Darjeeling and Shivanasamudra were among the first in Asia, and were established in 1898 and 1902 respectively.

India's potential for hydropower has been assessed to be about 125,570 MW at a 60% load factor. India is ranked fourth globally by underutilized hydropower potential. The estimated amount of viable hydropower varies with improved technology and the cost of electricity generation from other sources. In addition, there is an estimated 6,740 MW of potential for small, mini, and micro-hydro generators and 56 sites for pumped storage schemes with an aggregate installed capacity of 94,000 MW have been identified. In 2020, the power tariff from Solar PV clubbed with pumped storage hydro have fallen below the coal-based power plant tariffs in offering base load and peak load power supply.

The installed hydropower capacity as of 31 January 2023 was approximately 46,850 MW, 11.4% of the total installed utility capacity at the time. Small, mini, and micro-hydro generators add another 4,486 MW capacity. The share of this sector operated by public companies is 97%. Companies engaged in the development of hydroelectric power in India include the National Hydroelectric Power Corporation (NHPC), Northeast Electric Power Company (NEEPCO), Satluj Jal Vidyut Nigam (SJVNL), Tehri Hydro Development Corporation, and NTPC-Hydro.

Pumped storage schemes offer the potential for centralized peak power stations for load management in the electricity grid. They also produce secondary /seasonal power at no additional cost when rivers are flooding with excess water. Storing electricity by alternative systems such as batteries, compressed air storage systems, etc. is more costly than electricity production by standby generator. India has already established nearly 4,785 MW pumped storage capacity as part of its installed hydro power plants.

Hydropower is a low-carbon, renewable electricity source. However, its advantages are not limited to power generation. In fact, many of its other services are becoming increasingly important in the context of the energy transition and climate change. Hydropower plants offer a broad range of services to the grid that includes balancing and ancillary services. Additionally, hydropower can provide water services such as flood control, irrigation control, water distribution, recreational facilities, and wastewater control.

Solar power

The solar energy sector in India offers potentially enormous capacity, though little of this potential has so far been exploited. Solar radiation of about 5,000 trillion kWh per year is incident over India's land mass, with average daily solar power potential of 0.25 kWh/m2 of used land area with available commercially proven technologies. As of 31 December 2019, the installed capacity was 33.73 GW, or 2% of utility electricity generation.

Solar power plants require nearly  land per MW capacity, which is similar to coal-fired power plants when life cycle coal mining, consumptive water storage and ash disposal areas are taken into account, and hydropower plants when the submergence area of the water reservoir is included. Solar plants with 1.33 million MW capacity could be installed in India on 1% of its land, which is about 32,000 km2 (3,200,000 hectares). Large tracts of land that are unproductive, barren and devoid of vegetation exist in all parts of India, exceeding 8% of its total area. These are potentially suitable for solar power. It has been estimated that if 32,000 square km of these wastelands were used for solar power generation, 2000 billion kWh of electricity could be produced, twice the total power generated in 2013–14. Building solar power plants on marginally productive lands offers the potential for solar electricity to replace all of India's fossil fuel energy requirements (natural gas, coal, lignite, and crude oil), and could offer per capita energy consumption at par with USA/Japan for the peak population expected during its demographic transition.

In the same year, the levelised tariff in US$ for solar electricity fell to 1.31 cents/kWh, far below the solar PV sale tariff in India. In 2020, the power tariff from Solar PV clubbed with pumped storage hydro or battery storage have fallen below the coal based power plant tariffs in offering base load and peak load power supply.

Land acquisition is a challenge for solar farm projects in India. Some state governments are exploring innovative ways to address land availability, for example, by deploying solar capacity above irrigation canals. This allows solar energy to be harvested while simultaneously reducing the loss of irrigation water by solar evaporation. It was the first such project in India.

Synergy with other types of power generation

A major disadvantage of solar power is that it produces electricity only in daylight, and not during nighttime or cloudy daytime. This disadvantage can be overcome by installing grid storage, such as pumped-storage hydroelectricity. A proposed large-scale engineering project to interlink Indian rivers envisages coastal reservoirs for harnessing river waters that would also create pumped-storage hydropower capacity for use on daily basis by consuming the surplus solar power available during the day time. Existing and future hydropower stations can also be expanded with additional pumped-storage hydroelectricity units to cater for nighttime electricity consumption. Most of the groundwater pumping power required can be met directly by solar power during the daytime.

Concentrated solar power plants with thermal storage are also emerging as cheaper (US 5¢/kWh) and cleaner Load following power plants than fossil fuel power plants. They can respond to demand round the clock, and work as base load power plants when there is excess solar energy. A mix of solar thermal and solar photovoltaic plants offers the potential to match load fluctuations without requiring costly battery storage.

Wind power

India has the fourth largest installed wind power capacity in the world. The development of wind power in India began in the 1990s in Tamil Nadu and significantly increased in the last decade. As of 31 August 2022, the installed capacity of wind power was 41.205 GW, spread across many states of India. The largest wind power generating state is Tamil Nadu, accounting for nearly 23% of installed capacity, followed in decreasing order by Gujarat, Maharashtra, Rajasthan and Karnataka.

In 2015–16, wind power accounted for 8.5% of India's total installed power capacity, and 2.5% of the country's power output. India aims to install a total 60 GW of wind power capacity by 2022. The wind power tariff of around 2.5 INR/kWh is the cheapest of all power generation sources in India.

The offshore wind power potential of India is nearly 112 GW up to 50 metres water depth and nearly 195 GW up to 1000 metres water depth. As of August 2022, no offshore wind power installation is under construction or in operation. The levelised cost of electricity (LCOE) has fallen to US$ 50 per MWh for offshore wind power plants.

Biomass power
Biomass is organic matter from living organisms. As a renewable energy source, biomass can either be used directly via combustion to produce heat, or indirectly after converting it to various forms of biofuel using a range of methods which are broadly classified into thermal, chemical, and biochemical methods. Biomass, bagasse, forestry, domestic organic wastes, industrial organic wastes, organic residue from biogas plants, and agricultural residue and waste can all be used as fuel to produce electricity. Nearly 750 million tons of biomass that is not edible by cattle is available annually in India.

The total use of biomass to produce heat in India was nearly 177 Mtoe in 2013. 20% of households in India use biomass and charcoal for cooking purposes. This traditional use of biomass is being replaced by liquefied petroleum gas in rural areas, resulting in increased burning of biomass in fields, This has become a major source of air pollution in nearby towns and cities.

Torrefied biomass

Large quantities of imported coal are being used in pulverised coal-fired power stations. Raw biomass cannot be used directly in the pulverised coal mills as it is difficult to grind into fine powder due to caking. However, torrefaction makes it possible for biomass to replace coal. The hot flue gas of existing coal-fired power stations can be used as a heat source for torrefaction, so that biomass can be cofired with coal. Surplus agriculture/crop residue biomass is beginning to be used for this purpose. Instead of shutting down/ retirement of coal-fired power plants due to concerns over pollution, it has been argued that these units can be retrofitted economically to produce electricity from biomass.  Biomass contains substantial oxygen and lesser ash to make retrofitting of old units less capital intensive. Biomass power plants can also sell Renewable Energy Certificates, increasing their profitability. Cofiring of biomass up to 10% with coal in existing pulverised coal-fired power stations is successfully implemented in India. Central Government has made cofiring (minimum 5%) of biomass mandatary from October 2022 in all coal fired plants.

Biogas

In 2011, India started a new initiative to demonstrate the utility of medium-size mixed feed biogas-fertilizer pilot plants. The government approved 21 projects with an aggregate capacity of 37,016 cubic meters per day, of which 2 projects were successfully commissioned by December 2011. India commissioned a further 158 projects under its Biogas-based Distributed/Grid Power Generation program, with a total installed capacity of about 2 MW. In 2018, India has set a target of producing 15 million tons of biogas/bio-CNG by installing 5,000 large-scale commercial-type biogas plants which can produce daily 12.5 tons of bio-CNG by each plant. As of May 2022, nearly 35 such plants are in operation. Rejected organic solids from biogas plants can be used in coal plants after torrefaction.

Biogas is primarily methane, and can also be used to generate protein-rich feed for cattle, poultry and fish by growing Methylococcus capsulatus, a bacterium that grows directly on methane. This can be done economically in villages with low requirements for land and water. The carbon dioxide gas produced as a by-product from these units can be used in cheaper production of algae oil or spirulina from algae cultivation, which may eventually substitute for crude oil. Using biogas for protein-rich feed production is also eligible for carbon credits as this sequesters carbon from the atmosphere. There is significant potential to extract useful biomass from breweries, textile mills, fertilizer plants, the paper, and pulp industry, solvent extraction units, rice mills, petrochemical plants and other industries.

The government is exploring several ways to use agro waste or biomass in rural areas to improve the rural economy. For example, biomass gasifier technologies are being explored to produce power from surplus biomass resources such as rice husk, crop stalks, small wood chips and other agro-residues in rural areas. The largest biomass-based power plant in India at Sirohi, Rajasthan has a capacity of 20 MW. During 2011, India installed 25 rice husk based gasifier systems for distributed power generation in 70 remote villages of Bihar, including a total of 1.20 MW in Gujarat and 0.5 MW in Tamil Nadu. In addition, gasifier systems were installed at 60 rice mills in India.

Geothermal energy
India's geothermal energy installed capacity is experimental, and commercial use is insignificant. According to some estimates, India has 10,600 MW of geothermal energy available. The resource map for India has been grouped into six geothermal provinces:

Himalayan Province – Tertiary orogenic belt with tertiary magmatism
Faulted blocks province – the Aravalli range, Naga-Lushi, the west coast regions, and the Narmada-Son lineament.
Volcanic arc province – the Andaman and Nicobar arc.
Deep sedimentary basins of Tertiary age such as the Cambay basin.
Radioactive province – Surajkund, Hazaribagh and Jharkhand.
Cratonic province – Peninsular India

India has about 340 hot springs spread over the country. Of these, 62 are distributed along the northwest Himalaya, in the states of Jammu and Kashmir, Himachal Pradesh and Uttarakhand. They are found concentrated in a 30-50-km wide thermal band mostly along the river valleys. The Naga-Lusai and West Coast Provinces also manifest a series of thermal springs. The Andaman and Nicobar arc is the only place in India where volcanic activity continues, potentially a good site for geothermal energy. The Cambay geothermal belt is 200 km long and 50 km wide, with Tertiary sediments. Thermal springs have been reported from the belt although they are not of very high temperature or flow levels. High subsurface temperature and thermal fluid have been reported in deep drill wells in depth ranges of 1.7 to 1.9  km during drilling in this area. Steam blowout has also been reported in drill holes in a depth range of 1.5 to 3.4  km. The thermal springs in India's peninsular region are more related to the faults, which allow water to circulate to considerable depths. The circulating water acquires heat from the normal thermal gradient in the area, and can emerge at a high temperature.

In a December 2011 report, India identified six promising geothermal sites for the development of geothermal energy. In decreasing order of potential, these are:
Tattapani (Chhattisgarh)
Puga (Jammu & Kashmir)
Cambay Graben (Gujarat)
Manikaran (Himachal Pradesh)
Surajkund (Haryana)
Chhumathang (Jammu & Kashmir)

Puga and Chumathang area in Ladakh are deemed as the most promising geothermal fields in India. These areas were discovered in 1970s and initial exploratory efforts were made in the 1980s by Geological Survey of India (GSI). On 6 February 2021, the ONGC Energy Center (OEC) signed a Memorandum of Understanding (MoU) with Ladakh and the Ladakh Autonomous Hill Development Council, Leh in the presence of current Lieutenant governor Radha Krishna Mathur.

Tidal power
Tidal power, also called tidal energy, is a form of hydropower that converts energy obtained from tides into useful forms of power, mainly electricity. Local effects such as shelving, funneling, reflection and resonance can increase the potential of tidal energy in certain regions.

India's potential to harness tidal energy is significant. Energy can be extracted from tides in several ways. In one method, a reservoir is created behind a barrier, or barrage, and tidal waters are allowed to pass through turbines in the barrier to generate electricity. This method requires mean tidal differences greater than 4 metres and favourable topographical conditions to keep installation costs low. The Gulf of Khambhat and the Gulf of Kutch on India's west coast, with maximum tidal ranges of 11 m and 8 m, respectively, and an average tidal range of 6.77 m and 5.23 m, are promising sites for this type of technology. The Ganges Delta in the Sundarbans, West Bengal is another possibility, although it offers significantly less recoverable energy; the maximum tidal range in Sunderbans is approximately 5 m with an average tidal range of 2.97 m. It is estimated that barrage technology could harvest about 8 GW from tidal energy in India, primarily in Gujarat. The barrage approach has several disadvantages, however, one being that a badly engineered barrage can have significant negative effects on migratory fishes, marine ecosystems and aquatic life. Integrated barrage technology plants can also be expensive to build. In December 2011, the Ministry of New & Renewable Energy, Government of India and the Renewable Energy Development Agency of West Bengal jointly approved and agreed to implement India's first 3.75 MW Durgaduani mini tidal power project.

Another tidal wave technology harvests energy from surface waves or from pressure fluctuations below the sea surface. A report from the Ocean Engineering Centre, at the Indian Institute of Technology Madras estimated the annual wave energy potential along the Indian coast is 5 to 15 MW/metre, suggesting a theoretical maximum potential for electricity harvesting along India's 7500-kilometer coastline of about 40 GW. However, the realistic economical potential is likely to be considerably less than this. A significant barrier to surface energy harvesting is that its equipment may interfere with fishing and other sea-bound vessels, particularly in unsettled weather. India built its first surface energy harvesting technology demonstration plant in Vizhinjam, near Thiruvananthapuram.

The third approach to harvesting tidal energy is ocean thermal energy technology. This approach harvests the solar energy trapped in ocean waters. Oceans have a thermal gradient, the surface being much warmer than the deeper levels of the ocean. This thermal gradient may be harvested using the modified Rankine cycle. India's National Institute of Ocean Technology (NIOT) has attempted this approach without success. In 2003, NIOT attempted to build and deploy a 1 MW demonstration plant with Saga University of Japan, but mechanical problems prevented success. After initial tests near Kerala, the unit was scheduled for redeployment and further development in the Lakshadweep Islands in 2005.

Electricity transmission and distribution

As of 2013, India has a single wide area synchronous grid that covers the entire country except distant islands.

 
The total length of high voltage (HV) transmission lines (220kV and above) would be enough to form a square matrix of area 266 km2 (i.e. a square grid 16.3 km on a side, so that on average there is at least one HV line within a distance of 8.15 km) over the entire area of the country. This represents a total of almost 20% more HV transmission lines than that of the United States ( of 230 kV and above). However the Indian grid transmits far less electricity. The spread of total transmission lines (≥400 V) would be sufficient to form a square matrix of area 0.36 km2 (i.e. on average, at least one transmission line within 0.31 km distance) over the entire area of the country. In a future grid dominated by decentralized power generation like solar and wind power, unscientific expansion of the electrical grid would yield negative results due to braess paradox.

The all-time maximum peak load met was 182,610 MW on 30 May 2019. The maximum achieved demand factor of substations is nearly 60% at the 220 kV level. However, the operational performance of the system is not satisfactory in meeting peak electricity loads. This has led to the initiation of detailed forensic engineering studies, with a plan to make capital investments in a smart grid that maximizes the utility of the existing transmission infrastructure.

The introduction of an availability based tariff (ABT) originally helped to stabilize the Indian transmission grids. However, as the grid transitions to power surplus the ABT has become less useful. The July 2012 blackout, affecting the north of the country, was the largest power grid failure in history as measured by the number of people affected.

India's aggregate transmission and commercial (ATC) losses were nearly 21.35% in 2017–18. This compares unfavorably to the total ATC loss in the electricity sector of the United States, which was only 6.6% out of 4,404 billion kWh electricity supplied during the year 2018. The Indian government set a target of reducing losses to 17.1% by 2017 and to 14.1% by 2022. A high proportion of non-technical losses are caused by illegal tapping of lines, faulty electric meters and fictitious power generation that underestimates actual consumption and also contributes to reduced payment collection. A case study in Kerala estimated that replacing faulty meters could reduce distribution losses from 34% to 29%.

Foreign electricity trade
India's National Grid is synchronously interconnected to Bhutan, and asynchronously linked with Bangladesh, Myanmar and Nepal. An undersea interconnector to Sri Lanka (India–Sri Lanka HVDC Interconnection) have been proposed.

India has been exporting electricity to Bangladesh, Myanmar and Nepal and importing excess electricity from Bhutan. since 2016-17, India has been a net exporter of electricity with 9,232 Gwh exports and 7,597 Gwh imports, mainly from Bhutan, in 2021-22.  In 2018, Bangladesh proposed importing 10,000 MW power from India.

To encourage the carbon neutral solar power generation, plans are made to transform the Indian national grid into a transnational grid expanding up to Vietnam towards east and Iraq towards west spanning nearly 7,000 km wide. Being at the central location of the widened grid, India will be able to import the excess solar power available outside its territory at cheaper prices to meet the morning and evening peak load power demands without much costly energy storage.

Regulation and administration
The Ministry of Power is India's top union government body regulating the electrical energy sector in India. The ministry was created on 2 July 1992. It is responsible for planning, policy formulation, processing of projects for investment decisions, monitoring project implementation, training and manpower development, and the administration and enactment of legislation in regard to power generation, transmission and distribution. It is also responsible for the administration of India's Electricity Act (2003), the Energy Conservation Act (2001) and has the responsibility of undertaking amendments to these Acts when necessary to meet the union government's policy objectives.

Electricity is a concurrent list subject at Entry 38 in List III of the Seventh Schedule of the Constitution of India. In India's federal governance structure, this means that both the union government and India's state governments are involved in establishing policies and laws for the electricity sector. This requires the union government and individual state governments to enter into memoranda of understanding to help expedite projects in the individual states. To disseminate information to the public on power purchases by the distribution companies (discoms), the government of India recently started posting data on its website on a daily basis.

Trading
Bulk power purchasers can buy electricity on a daily basis for short, medium, and long-term durations from a reverse e-auction facility. The electricity prices transacted by the reverse e-auction facility are far less than the prices agreed under bilateral agreements. The commodity derivative exchange Multi Commodity Exchange has sought permission to offer electricity futures markets in India. The union government of India is also planning reverse procurement process in which generators and discoms with surplus power can seek e-bids for power supply for up to a one-year period, to put an end to bilateral contracts and determine the market-based price for electricity.

Energy saving certificates (PAT), various renewable purchase obligations (RPO), and renewable energy certificates (REC) are also traded on the power exchanges regularly.

Government-owned power companies
India's Ministry of Power administers central government-owned companies involved in the generation of electricity in India. These include the National Thermal Power Corporation, Neyveli Lignite Corporation,the SJVN, the Damodar Valley Corporation, the National Hydroelectric Power Corporation and the Nuclear Power Corporation of India. The Power Grid Corporation of India is also administered by the Ministry; it is responsible for the inter-state transmission of electricity and the development of the national grid.

The Ministry works with state governments on matters related to state government-owned corporations in India's electricity sector. Examples of state corporations include the Telangana Power Generation Corporation, the Andhra Pradesh Power Generation Corporation Limited, the Assam Power Generation Corporation Limited, the Tamil Nadu Electricity Board, the Maharashtra State Electricity Board, the Kerala State Electricity Board, the West Bengal State Electricity Distribution Company and Gujarat Urja Vikas Nigam Limited.

Funding of power infrastructure

India's Ministry of Power administers the Rural Electrification Corporation Limited and the Power Finance Corporation Limited. These central-government-owned public sector enterprises provide loans and guarantees for public and private electricity sector infrastructure projects in India. Excessive plant construction loans at 75% of overestimated costs on overrated plant capacities have led to stranded assets of US$40 to 60 billion. The central and state-owned power generators escaped this crisis as they had entered PPAs with state-owned monopolistic discoms on a cost-plus basis at higher than prevailing market power tariffs, without undergoing competitive bidding process. Many direct and indirect subsidies are given to various sectors.

Budgetary support
After the enactment of Electricity Act 2003 budgetary support to the power sector is negligible. Many State Electricity Boards were separated into their component parts after the act came into force, creating separate entities for generating, transmitting and distributing power.

Human resource development

The rapid growth of the electricity sector in India has generated high demand for trained personnel. India is making efforts to expand energy education and to enable existing educational institutions to introduce courses related to energy capacity addition, production, operations and maintenance. This initiative includes conventional and renewable energy.

The Ministry of New and Renewable Energy announced that State Renewable Energy Agencies are being supported to organize short-term training programs for installation, operation and maintenance, and repair of renewable energy systems in locations where intensive renewable energy programs are being implemented. Renewable Energy Chairs have been established at the Indian Institute of Technology Roorkee and the Indian Institute of Technology Kharagpur. The Central Training Institute Jabalpur is a training institute for power distribution engineering and management. The NTPC School of Business Noida has initiated an energy-centered two-year post-graduate diploma in the management program and a one-year post-graduate diploma in management (executive) program, to cater to the growing need for management professionals in this area. Education and availability of skilled workers are expected to be a key challenge in India's effort to expand its electricity sector.

Problems with India's power sector
India's electricity sector faces many issues, including:

Inadequate last mile connectivity. The country already has adequate generation and transmission capacity to meet the full consumer demand, both temporally and spatially. However, due to the lack of last-mile link-up between all electricity consumers and a reliable power supply (to exceed 99%), many consumers depend on diesel generators. Nearly 80 billion kWh of electricity is generated annually in India by diesel generator sets that consume nearly 15 million tons of diesel oil. Over 10 million households use battery storage UPS as back-ups in case of load shedding. India imports nearly US$2 billion worth of battery storage UPS every year. As overhead lines cause distribution problems during rain and wind storms, there is a plan to lay buried cables from low voltage substations to supply cheaper emergency power in cities and towns and thus reduce diesel oil consumption by diesel generator sets and the installation of UPS systems.
Demand build up measures. Electricity-intensive industries consume the cheaper electricity (average price Rs 2.5 per kWhr) available from the grid instead of running their own coal/gas/oil fired captive power plants. The captive power generation capacity by such plants is nearly 53,000 MW, and they are mainly established in steel, fertilizer, aluminium, cement, etc. industries. These plants can draw cheaper electricity from the grid on short term open access (STOA) basis, avoiding their own higher cost of electricity generation and diverting power from other consumers. Some of these idling captive power plants can be used for ancillary services or grid reserve service and earn extra revenue. 
Unequal electricity distribution. Almost all households have access to electricity. However, most households find the electricity supply intermittent and unreliable. At the same time, many power stations are idling for lack of electricity demand and the idling generation capacity is sufficient to supply the needs of households lacking electricity three times over.
Erratic power pricing. In general, industrial and commercial consumers subsidize domestic and agricultural consumers. This has financially crippled the distribution network, and its ability to pay to purchase power in the absence of subsidies from state governments. This situation has been worsened by state government departments that do not pay their electricity bills.
Over-rated capacity. Many coal-fired plants are overrated above the actual maximum continuous rating (MCR) capacity. to allow the plant cost to be inflated. These plants operate 15 to 10% below their declared capacity on a daily basis and rarely operate at declared capacity, undermining grid stability. 
Lack of timely information on load and demand. Intraday graphs at 15-minute or more frequent intervals are required to understand the shortcomings of the power grid with respect to grid frequency, including comprehensive data collected from SCADA for all grid-connected generating stations (≥ 100 KW) and load data from all substations. 
Lack of adequate coal supply: Despite abundant reserves of coal, power plants are frequently under-supplied. India's monopoly coal producer, state-controlled Coal India, is constrained by primitive mining techniques and is rife with theft and corruption.  Poor coal transport infrastructure has worsened these problems. Most of India's coal lies under protected forests or designated tribal lands and efforts to mine additional deposits have been resisted. 
Poor gas pipeline connectivity and infrastructure. India has abundant coal bed methane and natural gas potential. However a giant new offshore natural gas field has delivered far less gas than claimed, causing a shortage of natural gas.
Transmission, distribution and consumer-level losses. Losses exceed 30%, including the auxiliary power consumption of thermal power stations and fictitious electricity generation by wind generators, solar power plants & independent power producers (IPPs), etc.
Resistance to energy efficiency in the residential building sector. Continuous urbanization and the growth of population result in increased power consumption in buildings. The belief still predominates among stakeholders that energy-efficient buildings are more expensive than conventional buildings, adversely affecting the "greening" of the building sector.
Resistance to hydroelectric power projects. Hydroelectric power projects in India's mountainous north and northeast regions have been slowed down by ecological, environmental and rehabilitation controversies, coupled with public interest litigation.
Resistance to nuclear power generation. Political activism since the Fukushima disaster has reduced progress in this sector. The track record of executing nuclear power plants is also very poor in India.
Theft of power. The financial loss due to theft of electricity is estimated at $16 billion yearly.

Key implementation challenges for India's electricity sector include efficient performance of new project management and execution, ensuring availability and appropriate quality of fuel, developing the large coal and natural gas resources available in India, land acquisition, obtaining environmental clearances at state and central government level, and training skilled manpower.

Electricity as a substitute to imported LPG and kerosene 

India's net import of liquefied petroleum gas (LPG) is 6.093 million tons and the domestic consumption is 13.568 million tons with ₹ 41,546 crores subsidy to domestic consumers in 2012–13. The LPG import content is nearly 40% of total consumption in India. The affordable electricity retail tariff (860 Kcal/Kwh at 74% heating efficiency) to replace LPG (net calorific value 11,000 Kcal/Kg at 40% heating efficiency) in domestic cooking is up to 10.2 ₹/Kwh, when the retail price of LPG cylinder is ₹1000 (without subsidy) with 14.2 kg LPG content. Replacing LPG consumption with electricity would reduce imports substantially.

The domestic consumption of kerosene is 7.349 million tons with ₹30,151 crores subsidy to the domestic consumers in 2012–13. The subsidized retail price of kerosene is 13.69 ₹/liter whereas the export/import price is 48.00 ₹/liter. The affordable electricity retail tariff (860 Kcal/Kwh at 74% heating efficiency) to replace kerosene (net calorific value 8240 Kcal/liter at 40% heating efficiency) in domestic cooking is up to 9.27 ₹/kWh when the kerosene retail price is 48 ₹/liter.

In 2014–15, the plant load factor (PLF) of coal-fired thermal power stations was only 64.46%. These stations can run above 85% PLF if there is adequate electricity demand. The additional electricity generation at 85% PLF is nearly 240 billion kWh, enough to replace all the LPG and kerosene consumption in domestic sector. The incremental cost of generating additional electricity is only the coal fuel cost, less than 3 ₹/Kwh. Enhancing the PLF of coal-fired stations and encouraging domestic electricity consumers to substitute electricity in place of LPG and kerosene in household cooking would reduce government subsidies. It has been proposed that domestic consumers who are willing to surrender subsidized LPG/kerosene permits should be given a free electricity connection and a subsidized electricity tariff. Substantial scope is also present in micro, small, and medium enterprises (MSME) to switch over to electricity from fossil fuels to reduce cost of production provided uninterrupted power supply is ensured.

Since 2017, IPPs have offered to sell solar and wind power below 3.00 ₹/Kwh to feed into the high voltage grid. After considering distribution costs and losses, solar power appears to be a viable economic option for replacing the LPG and kerosene used in the domestic sector.

Electric vehicles 

The retail prices of petrol and diesel are high enough in India to make electricity driven vehicles relatively economical. The retail price of diesel was 101.00 ₹/litre in 2021–22, and the retail price of petrol was 110.00 ₹/litre. The affordable retail electricity price to replace diesel would be up to 19 ₹/Kwh (860 Kcal/Kwh at 75% input electricity to shaft power efficiency versus diesel's net calorific value of 8572 Kcal/liter at 40% fuel energy to crankshaft power efficiency), and the comparable number to replace petrol would be up to 28 ₹/Kwh (860 Kcal/Kwh at 75% input electricity to shaft power efficiency versus petrol's net calorific value at 7693 Kcal/litre at 33% fuel energy to crankshaft power efficiency). In 2012–13, India consumed 15.744 million tons of petrol and 69.179 million tons of diesel, both mainly produced from imported crude oil.

Electricity driven vehicles are expected to become popular in India when energy storage/battery technology offers improved range, longer life and lower maintenance. Vehicle to grid options are also attractive, potentially allowing electric vehicles to help to mitigate peak loads in the electricity grid. The potential for continuous charging of electric vehicles through wireless electricity transmission technology is being explored by Indian companies and others.

Energy reserves
India has abundant solar, wind, hydro (including pumped storage) and biomass power potential. In addition, as of January 2011 India had approximately 38 trillion cubic feet (Tcf) of proven natural gas reserves, the world's 26th largest reserve. The United States Energy Information Administration estimates that India produced approximately 1.8 Tcf of natural gas in 2010 while consuming roughly 2.3 Tcf of natural gas. India already produces coalbed methane.

See also

 Energy in India
 Energy policy of India
 Oil and gas industry in India
 Climate change in India
 East West Gas Pipeline (India)
 List of electricity organisations in India
 Central Electricity Authority (India)
 List of power stations in India
 Indian Rivers Inter-link
 List of countries by electricity production

Notes

References

External links
National electricity Plan – 2012, CEA, Government of India
 Electricity grid maps of the southern region 
India's Energy Policy and Electricity Production
 

 
Articles containing video clips